The Honaker Trail Formation is a geologic formation in Utah. It preserves fossils dating back to the Carboniferous period.

It is a member of the 3-member Hermosa Group and is located above the Paradox Formation in the dramatic site of Goosenecks State Park, Utah, notably Cataract Canyon. It is gray-colored above the multi-layered Paradox deep in Cataract Canyon, riverside.

Goosenecks panorama

See also

 Honaker Trail
 List of fossiliferous stratigraphic units in Utah
 Paleontology in Utah

References
 

Carboniferous geology of Utah
Limestone formations of the United States